The 1971 Widnes by-election took place on 23 September, following the death of the Labour MP James MacColl on 17 June of that year, and produced a victory for the incumbent Labour Party.

It remains the most recent by-election in England, Wales or Scotland to be contested by only two candidates.

Results

References

Widnes by-election
Widnes by-election
Widnes by-election
1970s in Lancashire
Widnes
Widnes 1971
Widnes 1971